The 1903 Vanderbilt Commodores football team represented Vanderbilt University during the 1903 Southern Intercollegiate Athletic Association football season. James R. Henry coached Vanderbilt for one season in 1903. His squad finished the season with a 6–1–1 record. The season was marred only by the upset loss to Cumberland. John J. Tigert and Bob Blake were both Rhodes Scholars.

Before the season
After the last game of the 1902 year, Walter H. Watkins announced his resignation of his position as head coach of the Vanderbilt football and baseball teams in order that he devote attention to the study of law exclusively. Vanderbilt made an effort to secure the services of coach Neil Snow, who was the University of Nashville (Peabody) coach.

Schedule

Season summary

Cumberland

Cumberland upset the Commodores 6–0, the first time Cumberland ever scored on Vanderbilt. Four minutes after the game started, Waterhouse had the decisive touchdown. M. O. Bridges had his right collarbone broken.

The starting lineup was B. Blake (left end), Pritchard (left tackle), Brown (left guard), Perry (center), Patterson (right guard), Graham (right tackle), Bryan (right end), Kyle (quarterback), D. Blake (left halfback), Hamilton (right halfback), Tigert (fullback).

Alabama
Vanderbilt, outweighing Alabama 15 pounds to the man, beat Alabama 30–0, in the first all-time meeting between the schools at Dudley Field. Frank Kyle starred with runs of 35, 30, 50, and 48 yards.

Vanderbilt took a 12–0 halftime lead after first half touchdowns were scored first by Ed Hamilton and followed by John J. Tigert. The Commodores then closed the game with three touchdowns in the second half scored by Hamilton, Dan Blake and Bob Blake for the 30–0 victory. Tigert converted all five PAT's in their victory.

The starting lineup was B. Blake (left end), Graham (left tackle), Brown (left guard), Perry (center), Patterson (right guard), Pritchard (right tackle), G. Jones (right end), Howell (quarterback), Kyle (left halfback), Hamilton (right halfback), Tigert (fullback).

Tennessee
Jones and John J. Tigert starred as the Tennessee Volunteers were beaten 40–0.

The starting lineup was  B. Blake (left end), Pritchard (left tackle), B. Brown (left guard), Perry (center), Patterson (right guard), Graham (right tackle), D. Blake (right end), Kyle (quarterback), Tigert (left halfback), Jones (right halfback), Hamilton (fullback).

Mississippi
In Mississippi, the Commodores beat Ole Miss 33–0.

Georgia
The Georgia Bulldogs could not check Vanderbilt's end runs and were easily beaten 33–0.

Texas
Vanderbilt tied the Texas Longhorns 5–5.

Washington University
Vanderbilt defeated Washington University by as core of 41–0.

Sewanee

Vanderbilt gave rival Sewanee its only loss, 10–5, the first team to even score on the Tigers. Sewanee was crippled in the first half by the loss of Stewart, who fractured his ankle in a scrimmage before the game. He tried to play through it, but had to be helped off the field. John J. Tigert, later a prominent educator, got Vanderbilt's first touchdown. Sewanee tied the score with a touchdown in the second half. Later, Vanderbilt had the ball at the 4-yard line third down. "As great a stand of a football elevve was that of Sewaee before Vanderbilt's winning touchdown was made." On third down from the 1-yard line the center Perry fell on a fumble. Sewanee protested that the runner was down, but Vanderbilt was awarded the touchdown. "Vanderbilt, in fact all Nashville, is wild with joy tonight. Sewanee is looking forward to next Thanksgiving."

The starting lineup was B. Blake (left end), Pritchard (left tackle), Brown (left guard), Perry (center), Patterson (right guard), Graham (right tackle), D. Blake (right end), Kyle (quarterback), Tigert (left halfback), Bryan (right halfback), and Hamilton (fullback).

Postseason

1903 met difficulty in determining an SIAA champion. Clemson had the best record, but lost to an inferior North Carolina team; and in the game to secure the SIAA title were tied by Cumberland. Clemson's John Heisman pushed strongly for Cumberland to share the SIAA title. Cumberland's strongest victory was its win over Vanderbilt. However, Sewanee beat Cumberland, yet suffered its only loss to Vanderbilt.

Notes

References

Bibliography
 

Vanderbilt
Vanderbilt Commodores football seasons
Vanderbilt Commodores football